Robertsdale High School is a high school located in Robertsdale, Alabama and it is a part of the Baldwin County Public Schools System. The current principal is Mr. William (Shay) White

Controversies 
During a school football pep rally for the Robertsdale Golden Bears to go against the Spanish Fort Toros, students were seen holding Trump flags and a sign that read "Put the panic back in Hispanic"

Alumni
Dave Stapleton, a Former MLB player who played for the (Boston Red Sox) from 1980 to 1986
Obie Trotter Professional basketball player for Szolnoki Olaj KK in the Hungarian Basketball National Championship
Tim Cook, the CEO of Apple Inc from  2011–Present.

Sports
Robertsdale high school hosts baseball, basketball, golf, swimming, tennis, soccer, track and field, volleyball, football, and wrestling.

External links
School website

References

Public high schools in Alabama
Schools in Baldwin County, Alabama